Réal Favreau is a judge currently serving on the Tax Court of Canada. He took office on October 27, 2006.

References

Judges of the Tax Court of Canada
Living people
Year of birth missing (living people)
Place of birth missing (living people)
21st-century Canadian judges